Edward Henry Charles James "Harry" Fox-Strangways, 7th Earl of Ilchester  (1 October 1905 – 21 August 1964) was a British peer and philanthropist.  He also held the subsidiary titles of Baron Strangways and Baron Ilchester and Stavordale.

Biography
He was educated at Eton College and Christ Church, Oxford, where he was part of the Railway Club, which included: Henry Yorke, Roy Harrod, Henry Thynne, 6th Marquess of Bath, David Plunket Greene, Fox-Strangways, Brian Howard, Michael Parsons, 6th Earl of Rosse, John Sutro, Hugh Lygon, Harold Acton, Bryan Guinness, 2nd Baron Moyne, Patrick Balfour, 3rd Baron Kinross, Mark Ogilvie-Grant, John Drury-Lowe.

He used the first name "Harry" and served as a Deputy Lieutenant of Dorset in 1957.

Family
He married Helen Elizabeth Ward, granddaughter of William Ward, 1st Earl of Dudley, on 27 April 1931. They had three children:
 Lady Theresa Jane Fox-Strangways (12 August 1932 - 1989), married Simon Monckton-Arundell, 9th Viscount Galway
 Giles Henry Holland Fox-Strangways (7 May 1934 - 2 September 1947, accidental death)
 Charles Stephen Fox-Strangways (6 May 1938 - 8 July 1958, killed while on emergency military operations in Cyprus)

With no surviving male issue, he was succeeded in the Earldom of Ilchester by Walter Angelo Fox-Strangways, a descendant of the 1st Earl of Ilchester and Harry's fifth cousin, once removed.

Arms

The arms of the head of the Fox-Strangways family are blazoned Quarterly of four: 1st & 4th: Sable, two lions passant paly of six argent and gules (Strangways); 2nd & 3rd: Ermine, on a chevron azure three foxes' heads and necks erased or on a canton of the second a fleur-de-lys of the third (Fox).

References

Portrait Gallery

Earls of Ilchester
English philanthropists
People educated at Eton College
Alumni of Christ Church, Oxford
Harry
Deputy Lieutenants of Dorset